Nikolai Ivanovich Kostrov (May 19, 1901 – April 11, 1995) was a Russian Soviet painter, graphic artist, and illustrator, who lived and worked in Leningrad. He was a member of the Leningrad Union of Artists, and regarded as one of representatives of the Leningrad school of painting and graphics.

Biography 
Nikolai Ivanovich Kostrov was born May 19, 1901 in the village Vasilievskoye, Vyatka Governorate of the Russian Empire.

In 1922, Nikolai Kostrov entered at the Leningrad VKHUTEIN (The Leningrad Higher Institute of Industrial Art, before 1918 known as the High Art School under Imperial Academy of Arts), where he studied under Alexander Savinov, Alexander Karev, and Michail Matjuschin.

In 1926 Nikolai Kostrov graduated from the VKHUTEIN together with Yuri Vasnetsov, Sofia Zaklikovskaya, Pavel Kondratiev, Vasily Kuptsov, Valentin Kurdov, Kirill Kustodiev, Evgenia Magaril, Gerta Nemenova, Alexei Pochteny, George Traugot, Evgeny Charushin, and other young artists.

Since 1926 Nikolai Kostrov has participated in Art Exhibitions. He painted portraits, landscapes, still lifes, worked as easel painter, graphic artist, and art illustrator. His personal exhibitions were in Leningrad (1937, 1962, 1973, 1979), in Saint-Petersburg (1996), and in Moscow (1974, 1983), partly together with his wife and artist Anna Kostrova.

Nikolai Kostrov was a member of the Leningrad Union of Artists since 1932.

Nikolai Ivanovich Kostrov died in Saint Petersburg on April 11, 1995. His paintings and graphics reside in State Russian Museum, in the Art Museums and private collections in the Russia, Germany, France, and others.

References

Bibliography 
 Sergei V. Ivanov. Unknown Socialist Realism. The Leningrad School. Saint Petersburg, NP-Print Edition, 2007. P.244, 245, 363, 382-385, 387-391, 394, 396-398, 400, 401, 411, 413-415, 418-420, 442-444. , .

External links 
 Portrait in painting of 1920-1990s. The Leningrad School. Part 2

1901 births
1995 deaths
People from Kirov Oblast
People from Nolinsky Uyezd
20th-century Russian painters
Russian male painters
Soviet painters
Socialist realist artists
Repin Institute of Arts alumni
Members of the Leningrad Union of Artists
20th-century Russian male artists